Kilometer Zero (translit. Nulevoy kilometr) is a 2007 romantic thriller film by Pavel Sanayev, released in Russia on October 25, 2007.

Plot 
Kostya and Oleg come to Moscow from Murmansk. Kostya dreams of becoming a professional music video director, Oleg is aiming high to a respectable  capital citizen. They make friends and support each other, going, however, their own ways.

By chance, Oleg and Kostya meet Shepilov, a successful businessman. At a glance he sees Oleg is talented in talking people into doing what they do not need. Shepilov offers Oleg a job with a realty company. The trouble is that Kostya falls in love with Alina, Shepilov's former fiancée, who he still hopes to get back to love him.

Shepilov cancels Alina's performance that had to be the crucial one for her further career. However, Kostya makes a video for Alina that soon brings her a contract offer from London.

Now Alina has got to make up her mind for either love or career as the contract forces her to make a break with Kostya. Kostya in his turn gets to choose whether to go to London with Alina or to accept a job offer from a well-known producer and achieve what he dreamed of. Oleg as well must decide what is more important to him — friendship or his  respectable  status.

Oleg finds out the business that made him turn away from his friend is spattered with blood. Oleg is in danger and Kostya is the only one to help him out. But both Kostya and Alina themselves are already chased after as they might witness against Shepilov. So now Kostya does not only have to save himself and the girl her loves, but also his friend who betrayed him.

Cast 
 Svetlana Khodchenkova as Alina
 Alexander Lymarev as Kostya
 Konstantin Kryukov as Artur
 Ivan Zhidkov as Oleg
 Dmitry Nagiev as Sergey Borisovich
 Yuri Tsurilo as Bondarev
 Elena Sanayeva as Olga Sergeyevna
 Alexander Efimov as Shepilov
 Boris Tenin as Isaev
 Andrey Malakhov (cameo)
 Fedor Bondarchuk (cameo)

References

External links 
 

2007 films
2000s Russian-language films
Russian romantic thriller films
2000s romantic thriller films